Fred Bronstein is an American pianist, music educator, and academic administrator. He has served as dean of the Peabody Institute since 2014. He was previously the president of the St. Louis Symphony Orchestra, Omaha Symphony Orchestra, and the Dallas Symphony Orchestra.

References 

Living people
Year of birth missing (living people)
Place of birth missing (living people)
20th-century American pianists
21st-century American pianists
American university and college faculty deans
Peabody Institute faculty